Neutral waters is a legal term from international laws of war, that refers to territorial waters of a state which maintains neutrality respective to the conflict in question. For example, San Remo Manual on International Law Applicable to Armed Conflicts at Sea defines the neutral waters as follows (article 14):

In colloquial use, however, this term is often used as synonymous to international waters.

References

Admiralty law